The 1979 National League was contested as the second division/tier of Speedway in the United Kingdom.

Summary
The league was reduced from 20 teams to 19 from the previous season. White City Rebels closure saw their riders move to Eastbourne Eagles who moved up to the British League. Barrow Furness Flyers dropped out and Nottingham Outlaws joined the league. Teesside Tigers changed their name to Middlesbrough Tigers. Scunthorpe Saints changed their name to Scunthorpe Stags.

Tom Owen of Newcastle topped the averages for the third consecutive year and Ian Gledhill, riding for Stoke won the Riders' Championship but both Newcastle and Stoke finished well behind Mildenhall Fen Tigers and Rye House Rockets in the league table. In a season that would go down to the last match, Mildenhall won their first title in their history. The consistency of four riders, Ray Bales, Mick Hines, Melvyn Taylor and Robert Henry was the crucial factor to their success.

There was a controversial end to the season when Rye House visited Mildenhall, needing a draw to win the title. Needing a 5-1 in the last heat to tie the match, Rocket Karl Fiala's exclusion prompted team-mate Bob Garrad to withdraw from the re-run in protest. Mildenhall went on to win at bottom club Scunthorpe Saints in the last match of the season to win the title by one point.

Final table

National League Knockout Cup
The 1979 National League Knockout Cup was the 12th edition of the Knockout Cup for tier two teams. Rye House Rockets were the winners of the competition.

First round

Second round

Quarter-finals

Semi-finals

Final
First leg

Second leg

Rye House were declared Knockout Cup Champions, winning on aggregate 92–64.

Final leading averages
The top ten averages of the National League.

Riders & final averages
Berwick

Steve McDermott 9.13 
Wayne Brown 9.00
Mike Fullerton 7.71 
Graham Jones 7.58 
Nigel Close 7.24
Phil Kynman 6.20
Roger Wright 6.16
Mike Caroline 4.36
Rob Grant Sr 4.00

Boston

David Gagen 9.27
Rob Hollingworth 8.91
Dave Allen 8.23
Tony Featherstone 6.12
Dennis Mallett 4.85
Andy Fisher 4.48
Dave Mortiboys 3.80
Andy Hibbs 3.67
Colin Ackroyd 2.60

Canterbury

Mike Ferreira 8.35 
Nigel Boocock 8.32
Barney Kennett 7.17
Dave Piddock 7.00
Tim Hunt 6.93
Roger Abel 5.08
Mick Wilde 4.13
Graham Clifton 4.11
Peter Christopher 4.00
Neil Farnish 3.92
Tony Reynolds 2.67

Crayford

Steve Naylor 9.03 
Alan Sage 8.14
Laurie Etheridge 8.00
Paul Woods 7.63 
Les Rumsey 4.76
Richard Davey 4.26
Paul Gilbert 3.53
Paul Hollingsbee 3.37
John Hooper 3.31
Jack Bibby 0.94

Edinburgh

Dave Trownson 7.78
Steve Lomas 7.18
Bert Harkins 6.72
Brian Collins 6.56
Alan Bridgett 5.51
Ivan Blacka 5.30
Benny Rourke 5.25
Rob Mouncer 5.21
Roger Lambert 3.03

Ellesmere Port

Steve Finch 9.52 
John Jackson 9.27
Louis Carr 6.95
John Williams 5.98
Pete Ellams 5.23
Eric Monaghan 4.69
Robert Craven 4.00
Paul Tyrer 3.83
Paul Embley 3.80
Peter Carr 2.44

Glasgow

Merv Janke 9.06
Steve Lawson 9.06
Derek Richardson 8.05
Andy Reid 6.25
Colin Caffrey 6.12
Charlie McKinna 5.89
Jim Beaton 5.76
Keith Bloxsome 5.23

Middlesbrough

Steve Wilcock 8.97 
Malcolm Corradine 7.88 
Geoff Pusey 6.96
Mark Courtney 6.92
Martin Dixon 5.02
Martyn Cusworth 4.76
Paul Stead 3.77
Mike Sanderson 1.90

Mildenhall

Ray Bales 9.51 
Mick Hines 9.31
Melvyn Taylor 9.06 
Robert Henry 8.87
Mike Spink 6.58
Mick Bates 6.52
Richard Knight 5.66
Mark Baldwin 4.96

Milton Keynes

Andy Grahame 9.57
Bob Humphreys 9.29 
Derek Harrison 8.04 
Malcolm Holloway 5.96
David Ashby 5.43
Harry MacLean 4.41
Greg McNeill 3.93
Chris Robins 3.59

Newcastle

Tom Owen 11.18
Robbie Blackadder 7.93 
Rod Hunter 7.86
Graeme Stapleton 6.57 
David Bargh 5.91
Neil Coddington 5.75
Nigel Crabtree 4.72
Paul Brown 1.90
Mick Easton 1.60

Nottingham

Dave Perks 10.13
Mike Sampson 9.62
Kevin Hawkins 8.03
Glenn MacDonald 5.28
Les Sawyer 5.07
Nigel Wasley 4.83
Craig Featherby 4.82 
John Homer 3.19
Mark Williams 1.07

Oxford

George Hunter 10.86 
Les Rumsey 9.78
Pip Lamb 9.27
John Hack 6.81
Carl Askew 6.62
John Barker 6.47
Mick Handley 5.32
Colin Ackroyd 3.15
Rob Dole 2.60

Peterborough

Nigel Flatman 8.52
Richard Greer 7.50
Dave Gooderham 7.33
Andy Hines 7.26
Ian Clark 6.71
Nigel Couzens 6.06
Brian Clark 5.77
Peter Spink 5.70
Steve Popely 4.41
Paul Tapp 4.00
Ken Matthews 3.69

Rye House

Karl Fiala 9.20
Bobby Garrad 9.11
Kelvin Mullarkey 8.71 
Kevin Smith 8.19
Ted Hubbard 8.16 
Ashley Pullen 7.34
Hugh Saunders 6.57
Peter Tarrant 5.23

Scunthorpe

Phil White 7.59
Arthur Browning 7.28 
Rob Maxfield .6.77
Arthur Price 4.73
Kevin Teager 4.18
Trevor Whiting 3.78
Stuart Cope 3.25
Ian Jeffcoate 3.19
Phil Cain 2.78
Rob Woffinden 2.50

Stoke

Ian Gledhill 8.21
Billy Burton 7.06
Tony Lomas 6.76
Chris Turner 6.42
Ian Robertson 6.19
Stuart Mountford 6.17
Nicky Allott 5.57
Frank Smith 5.53
Alan MacLean 3.33
Ian Jeffcoate 2.94
Paul Evitts 2.31

Weymouth

Brian Woodward 8.01
Doug Underwood 7.19
Bob Coles .7.09
Malcolm Shakespeare 6.23
Terry Tulloch 4.74
Garry May 4.20
Kevin Bowen 3.70
Nigel Davis 3.24
Mark DeKok 2.15

Workington

Alan Emerson 8.99
Brian Havelock 7.58
Arnold Haley 6.87
Ian Hindle 6.7 
Mark Dickinson 6.54
Neil Collins 6.13
Andy Margarson 
Mick Blaynee 3.88
Des Wilson 3.60
Tim Nichol 1.91

See also
List of United Kingdom Speedway League Champions
Knockout Cup (speedway)

References

Speedway British League Division Two / National League